Davis County is a county located in the U.S. state of Iowa. As of the 2020 census, the population was 9,110. The county seat is Bloomfield.

Davis County is included in the Ottumwa, IA Micropolitan Statistical Area.

History
Davis County was named in honor of Garrett Davis, a Congressman from Kentucky from March 4, 1839, until March 3, 1847, and later a US Senator from Kentucky.

Geography

Major highways
 U.S. Highway 63
 Iowa Highway 2
 Iowa Highway 202

Adjacent counties
 Wapello County  (north)
 Monroe County (northwest)
 Van Buren County  (east)
 Jefferson County  (northeast)
 Scotland County, Missouri  (southeast)
 Schuyler County, Missouri  (southwest)
 Appanoose County  (west)

Demographics

2020 census
There were 3,579 housing units of which 3,258 were occupied.

2010 census
There were 3,600 housing units, of which 3,201 were occupied.

2000 census
	
As of the census of 2000, there were 8,541 people, 3,207 households, and 2,286 families residing in the county.  The population density was 17 people per square mile (7/km2).  There were 3,530 housing units at an average density of 7 per square mile (3/km2).  The racial makeup of the county was 98.35% White, 0.18% Black or African American, 0.21% Native American, 0.20% Asian, 0.05% Pacific Islander, 0.21% from other races, and 0.81% from two or more races.  0.71% of the population were Hispanic or Latino of any race. 10.4% of the population speak either German or Pennsylvania German at home.

There were 3,207 households, out of which 32.00% had children under the age of 18 living with them, 62.70% were married couples living together, 5.20% had a female householder with no husband present, and 28.70% were non-families. 25.00% of all households were made up of individuals, and 13.80% had someone living alone who was 65 years of age or older.  The average household size was 2.61 and the average family size was 3.13.

In the county, the population was spread out, with 27.10% under the age of 18, 7.40% from 18 to 24, 25.20% from 25 to 44, 22.90% from 45 to 64, and 17.40% who were 65 years of age or older.  The median age was 38 years. For every 100 females there were 97.90 males.  For every 100 females age 18 and over, there were 94.10 males.

The median income for a household in the county was $32,864, and the median income for a family was $40,982. Males had a median income of $26,818 versus $21,726 for females. The per capita income for the county was $15,127.  About 9.00% of families and 11.90% of the population were below the poverty line, including 12.70% of those under age 18 and 12.80% of those age 65 or over.

Communities

Cities
Bloomfield
Drakesville
Floris
Pulaski

Unincorporated communities
Troy
West Grove

Townships
Davis County is divided into these townships:

 Cleveland
 Drakesville
 Fabius
 Fox River
 Grove
 Lick Creek
 Marion
 Perry
 Prairie
 Roscoe
 Salt Creek
 Soap Creek
 Union
 West Grove
 Wyacondah

Population ranking
The population ranking of the following table is based on the 2020 census of Davis County.

† county seat

Notable people
 John Pickler, member of the United States House of Representatives, resident of Davis County.

Politics

See also

National Register of Historic Places listings in Davis County, Iowa

References

External links

County website
City-Data.com

 
1843 establishments in Iowa Territory
Populated places established in 1843